The Mick may refer to:

The Mick (TV series)
Mickey Mantle

See also
Mick (disambiguation)